Crocodiles (family Crocodylidae) or true crocodiles are large semiaquatic reptiles that live throughout the tropics in Africa, Asia, the Americas and Australia. The term crocodile is sometimes used even more loosely to include all extant members of the order Crocodilia, which includes the alligators and caimans (family Alligatoridae), the gharial and false gharial (family Gavialidae) among other extinct taxa.

Although they appear similar, crocodiles, alligators and the gharial belong to separate biological families. The gharial, with its narrow snout, is easier to distinguish, while morphological differences are more difficult to spot in crocodiles and alligators. The most obvious external differences are visible in the head, with crocodiles having narrower and longer heads, with a more V-shaped than a U-shaped snout compared to alligators and caimans. Another obvious trait is that the upper and lower jaws of the crocodiles are the same width, and the teeth in the lower jaw fall along the edge or outside the upper jaw when the mouth is closed; therefore, all teeth are visible, unlike an alligator, which possesses in the upper jaw small depressions into which the lower teeth fit. Also, when the crocodile's mouth is closed, the large fourth tooth in the lower jaw fits into a constriction in the upper jaw. For hard-to-distinguish specimens, the protruding tooth is the most reliable feature to define the species' family. Crocodiles have more webbing on the toes of the hind feet and can better tolerate saltwater due to specialized salt glands for filtering out salt, which are present, but non-functioning, in alligators. Another trait that separates crocodiles from other crocodilians is their much higher levels of aggression.

Crocodile size, morphology, behaviour and ecology differ somewhat among species. However, they have many similarities in these areas as well. All crocodiles are semiaquatic and tend to congregate in freshwater habitats such as rivers, lakes, wetlands and sometimes in brackish water and saltwater. They are carnivorous animals, feeding mostly on vertebrates such as fish, reptiles, birds and mammals, and sometimes on invertebrates such as molluscs and crustaceans, depending on species and age. All crocodiles are tropical species that, unlike alligators, are very sensitive to cold. They separated from other crocodilians during the Eocene epoch, about 55 million years ago. Many species are at the risk of extinction, some being classified as critically endangered.

Etymology
The word crocodile comes from the Ancient Greek  meaning 'lizard', used in the phrase , "the lizard of the (Nile) river". There are several variant Greek forms of the word attested, including the later form  found cited in many English reference works. In the Koine Greek of Roman times,  and  would have been pronounced identically, and either or both may be the source of the Latinized form  used by the ancient Romans. It is ascribed to Herodotus, and supposedly describes the basking habits of the Egyptian crocodile.

The form  is attested in Medieval Latin. The Modern English form crocodile was adapted directly from the Classical Latin  in the 16th century, replacing the earlier form. The use of -y- in the scientific name Crocodylus (and forms derived from it) is a corruption introduced by Laurenti (1768).

Species

A total of 18 extant species have been recognized. Further genetic study is needed for the confirmation of proposed species under the genus Osteolaemus.

Characteristics

A crocodile's physical traits allow it to be a successful predator. Its external morphology is a sign of its aquatic and predatory lifestyle. Its streamlined body enables it to swim swiftly; it also tucks its feet to the side while swimming, making it faster by decreasing water resistance. Crocodiles have webbed feet which, though not used to propel them through the water, allow them to make fast turns and sudden moves in the water or initiate swimming. Webbed feet are an advantage in shallow water, where the animals sometimes move around by walking. Crocodiles have a palatal flap, a rigid tissue at the back of the mouth that blocks the entry of water. The palate has a special path from the nostril to the glottis that bypasses the mouth. The nostrils are closed during submergence.

Like other archosaurs, crocodilians are diapsid, although their post-temporal fenestrae are reduced. The walls of the braincase are bony but lack supratemporal and postfrontal bones. Their tongues are not free, but held in place by a membrane that limits movement; as a result, crocodiles are unable to stick out their tongues. Crocodiles have smooth skin on their bellies and sides, while their dorsal surfaces are armoured with large osteoderms. The armoured skin has scales and is thick and rugged, providing some protection. They are still able to absorb heat through this armour, as a network of small capillaries allows blood through the scales to absorb heat. The osteoderms are highly vascularised and aid in calcium balance, both to neutralize acids while the animal cannot breathe underwater and to provide calcium for eggshell formation. Crocodilian tegument have pores believed to be sensory in function, analogous to the lateral line in fishes. They are particularly seen on their upper and lower jaws. Another possibility is that they are secretory, as they produce an oily substance which appears to flush mud off.

Size

Size greatly varies among species, from the dwarf crocodile to the saltwater crocodile. Crocodilians show pronounced sexual dimorphism, with males growing much larger and more rapidly than females. The largest species of crocodile is the saltwater crocodile, found in eastern India, northern Australia, throughout South-east Asia, and in the surrounding waters.

The brain volume of two adult crocodiles was 5.6 cm3 for a spectacled caiman and 8.5 cm3 for a larger Nile crocodile.

The largest crocodile ever held in captivity is a saltwater–Siamese hybrid named Yai (meaning big; born 10 June 1972) at the Samutprakarn Crocodile Farm and Zoo, Thailand. This animal measures  in length and weighs .

Teeth
Crocodiles are polyphyodonts; they are able to replace each of their 80 teeth up to 50 times in their 35- to 75-year lifespan. Next to each full-grown tooth, there is a small replacement tooth and an odontogenic stem cell in the dental lamina in standby that can be activated if required.

Biology and behaviour

Crocodilians are more closely related to birds and dinosaurs than to most animals classified as reptiles, the three families being included in the group Archosauria ('ruling reptiles'). Despite their prehistoric look, crocodiles are among the more biologically complex reptiles. Unlike other reptiles, a crocodile has a cerebral cortex and a four-chambered heart. Crocodilians also have the functional equivalent of a diaphragm by incorporating muscles used for aquatic locomotion into respiration. Salt glands are present in the tongues of crocodiles and they have a pore opening on the surface of the tongue, a trait that separates them from alligators. Salt glands are dysfunctional in Alligatoridae. Their function appears to be similar to that of salt glands in marine turtles. Crocodiles do not have sweat glands and release heat through their mouths. They often sleep with their mouths open and may pant like a dog. Four species of freshwater crocodile climb trees to bask in areas lacking a shoreline.

Senses

Crocodiles have acute senses, an evolutionary advantage that makes them successful predators. The eyes, ears and nostrils are located on top of the head, allowing the crocodile to lie low in the water, almost totally submerged and hidden from prey.

Vision
Crocodiles have very good night vision, and are mostly nocturnal hunters. They use the disadvantage of most prey animals' poor nocturnal vision to their advantage. The light receptors in crocodilians' eyes include cones and numerous rods, so it is assumed all crocodilians can see colours. Crocodiles have vertical-slit shaped pupils, similar to those of domestic cats. One explanation for the evolution of slit pupils is that they exclude light more effectively than a circular pupil, helping to protect the eyes during daylight. On the rear wall of the eye is a tapetum lucidum, which reflects incoming light back onto the retina, thus utilizing the small amount of light available at night to best advantage. In addition to the protection of the upper and lower eyelids, crocodiles have a nictitating membrane (sometimes called a "third eye-lid") that can be drawn over the eye from the inner corner while the lids are open. The eyeball surface is thus protected under the water while a certain degree of vision is still possible.

Olfaction
Crocodilian sense of smell is also very well developed, aiding them to detect prey or animal carcasses that are either on land or in water, from far away. It is possible that crocodiles use olfaction in the egg prior to hatching.

Chemoreception in crocodiles is especially interesting because they hunt in both terrestrial and aquatic surroundings. Crocodiles have only one olfactory chamber and the vomeronasal organ is absent in the adults indicating all olfactory perception is limited to the olfactory system. Behavioural and olfactometer experiments indicate that crocodiles detect both air-borne and water-soluble chemicals and use their olfactory system for hunting. When above water, crocodiles enhance their ability to detect volatile odorants by gular pumping, a rhythmic movement of the floor of the pharynx. Crocodiles close their nostrils when submerged, so olfaction underwater is unlikely. Underwater food detection is presumably gustatory and tactile.

Hearing
Crocodiles can hear well; their tympanic membranes are concealed by flat flaps that may be raised or lowered by muscles.

Touch
The touch sensors, concentrated in crocodile skin, can be thicker than those in human fingerprints. Crocodiles can feel the touch on their skin. 

Cranial: The upper and lower jaws are covered with sensory pits, visible as small, black speckles on the skin, the crocodilian version of the lateral line organs seen in fish and many amphibians, though arising from a completely different origin. These pigmented nodules encase bundles of nerve fibers innervated beneath by branches of the trigeminal nerve. They respond to the slightest disturbance in surface water, detecting vibrations and small pressure changes as small as a single drop. This makes it possible for crocodiles to detect prey, danger and intruders, even in total darkness. These sense organs are known as domed pressure receptors (DPRs).

Post-Cranial: While alligators and caimans have DPRs only on their jaws, crocodiles have similar organs on almost every scale on their bodies. The function of the DPRs on the jaws is clear; to catch prey, but it is still not clear what the function is of the organs on the rest of the body. The receptors flatten when exposed to increased osmotic pressure, such as that experienced when swimming in sea water hyperosmotic to the body fluids. When contact between the integument and the surrounding sea water solution is blocked, crocodiles are found to lose their ability to discriminate salinities. It has been proposed that the flattening of the sensory organ in hyperosmotic sea water is sensed by the animal as "touch", but interpreted as chemical information about its surroundings. This might be why in alligators they are absent on the rest of the body.

Hunting and diet

Crocodiles are ambush predators, waiting for fish or land animals to come close, then rushing out to attack. Crocodiles mostly eat fish, amphibians, crustaceans, molluscs, birds, reptiles, and mammals, and they occasionally cannibalize smaller crocodiles. What a crocodile eats varies greatly with species, size and age. From the mostly fish-eating species, like the slender-snouted and freshwater crocodiles, to the larger species like the Nile crocodile and the saltwater crocodile that prey on large mammals, such as buffalo, deer and wild boar, diet shows great diversity. Diet is also greatly affected by the size and age of the individual within the same species. All young crocodiles hunt mostly invertebrates and small fish, gradually moving on to larger prey. Being ectothermic (cold-blooded) predators, they have a very slow metabolism, so they can survive long periods without food. Despite their appearance of being slow, crocodiles have a very fast strike and are top predators in their environment, and various species have been observed attacking and killing other predators such as sharks and big cats. Crocodiles are also known to be aggressive scavengers who feed upon carrion and steal from other predators. Evidence suggests that crocodiles also feed upon fruits, based on the discovery of seeds in stools and stomachs from many subjects as well as accounts of them feeding.

Crocodiles have the most acidic stomach of any vertebrate. They can easily digest bones, hooves and horns. The BBC TV reported that a Nile crocodile that has lurked a long time underwater to catch prey builds up a large oxygen debt. When it has caught and eaten that prey, it closes its right aortic arch and uses its left aortic arch to flush blood loaded with carbon dioxide from its muscles directly to its stomach; the resulting excess acidity in its blood supply makes it much easier for the stomach lining to secrete more stomach acid to quickly dissolve bulks of swallowed prey flesh and bone. Many large crocodilians swallow stones (called gastroliths or stomach stones), which may act as ballast to balance their bodies or assist in crushing food, similar to grit ingested by birds. Herodotus claimed that Nile crocodiles had a symbiotic relationship with certain birds, such as the Egyptian plover, which enter the crocodile's mouth and pick leeches feeding on the crocodile's blood; with no evidence of this interaction actually occurring in any crocodile species, it is most likely mythical or allegorical fiction.

Bite

Since they feed by grabbing and holding onto their prey, they have evolved sharp teeth for piercing and holding onto flesh, and powerful muscles to close the jaws and hold them shut. The teeth are not well-suited to tearing flesh off of large prey items as are the dentition and claws of many mammalian carnivores, the hooked bills and talons of raptorial birds, or the serrated teeth of sharks. However, this is an advantage rather than a disadvantage to the crocodile since the properties of the teeth allow it to hold onto prey with the least possibility of the prey animal escaping. Cutting teeth, combined with the exceptionally high bite force, would pass through flesh easily enough to leave an escape opportunity for prey. The jaws can bite down with immense force, by far the strongest bite of any animal.

The study, led by Dr. Gregory M. Erickson, also shed light on the larger, extinct species of crocodilians. Since crocodile anatomy has changed only slightly over the last 80 million years, current data on modern crocodilians can be used to estimate the bite force of extinct species. The extraordinary bite of crocodilians is a result of their anatomy. The space for the jaw muscle in the skull is very large, which is easily visible from the outside as a bulge at each side. The muscle is so stiff, it is almost as hard as bone to touch, as if it were the continuum of the skull. Another trait is that most of the muscle in a crocodile's jaw is arranged for clamping down. Despite the strong muscles to close the jaw, crocodiles have extremely small and weak muscles to open the jaw. Crocodiles can thus be subdued for study or transport by taping their jaws or holding their jaws shut with large rubber bands cut from automobile inner tubes.

Locomotion

Crocodiles can move quickly over short distances, even out of water. The land speed record for a crocodile is  measured in a galloping Australian freshwater crocodile. Maximum speed varies between species. Some species can gallop, including Cuban crocodiles, Johnston's crocodiles, New Guinea crocodiles, African dwarf crocodiles, and even small Nile crocodiles. The fastest means by which most species can move is a "belly run", in which the body moves in a snake-like (sinusoidal) fashion, limbs splayed out to either side paddling away frantically while the tail whips to and fro. Crocodiles can reach speeds of  when they "belly run", and often faster if slipping down muddy riverbanks. When a crocodile walks quickly, it holds its legs in a straighter and more upright position under its body, which is called the "high walk". This walk allows a speed of up to 5 km/h.

Crocodiles may possess a homing instinct. In northern Australia, three rogue saltwater crocodiles were relocated  by helicopter, but returned to their original locations within three weeks, based on data obtained from tracking devices attached to them.

Longevity
Measuring crocodile age is unreliable, although several techniques are used to derive a reasonable guess. The most common method is to measure lamellar growth rings in bones and teeth—each ring corresponds to a change in growth rate which typically occurs once a year between dry and wet seasons. Bearing these inaccuracies in mind, it can be safely said that all crocodile species have an average lifespan of at least 30–40 years, and in the case of larger species an average of 60–70 years. The oldest crocodiles appear to be the largest species. C. porosus is estimated to live around 70 years on average, with limited evidence of some individuals exceeding 100 years.

In captivity, some individuals are claimed to have lived for over a century. A male crocodile lived to an estimated age of 110–115 years in a Russian zoo in Yekaterinburg. Named Kolya, he joined the zoo around 1913 to 1915, fully grown, after touring in an animal show, and lived until 1995. A male freshwater crocodile lived to an estimated age of 120–140 years at the Australia Zoo. Known affectionately as "Mr. Freshie", he was rescued around 1970 by Bob Irwin and Steve Irwin, after being shot twice by hunters and losing an eye as a result, and lived until 2010. Crocworld Conservation Centre, in Scottburgh, South Africa, claims to have a male Nile crocodile that was born in 1900. Named Henry, the crocodile is said to have lived in Botswana along the Okavango River, according to centre director Martin Rodrigues.

Social behaviour and vocalization

Crocodiles are the most social of reptiles. Even though they do not form social groups, many species congregate in certain sections of rivers, tolerating each other at times of feeding and basking. Most species are not highly territorial, with the exception of the saltwater crocodile, which is a highly territorial and aggressive species: a mature, male saltwater crocodile will not tolerate any other males at any time of the year, but most other species are more flexible. There is a certain form of hierarchy in crocodiles: the largest and heaviest males are at the top, having access to the best basking site, while females are priority during a group feeding of a big kill or carcass. A good example of the hierarchy in crocodiles would be the case of the Nile crocodile. This species clearly displays all of these behaviours. Studies in this area are not thorough, however, and many species are yet to be studied in greater detail. Mugger crocodiles are also known to show toleration in group feedings and tend to congregate in certain areas. However, males of all species are aggressive towards each other during mating season, to gain access to females.

Crocodiles are also the most vocal of all reptiles, producing a wide variety of sounds during various situations and conditions, depending on species, age, size and sex. Depending on the context, some species can communicate over 20 different messages through vocalizations alone. Some of these vocalizations are made during social communication, especially during territorial displays towards the same sex and courtship with the opposite sex; the common concern being reproduction. Therefore most conspecific vocalization is made during the breeding season, with the exception being year-round territorial behaviour in some species and quarrels during feeding. Crocodiles also produce different distress calls and in aggressive displays to their own kind and other animals; notably other predators during interspecific predatory confrontations over carcasses and terrestrial kills.

Specific vocalisations include —

 Chirp: When about to hatch, the young make a "peeping" noise, which encourages the female to excavate the nest. The female then gathers the hatchlings in her mouth and transports them to the water, where they remain in a group for several months, protected by the female
 Distress call: A high-pitched call used mostly by younger animals to alert other crocodiles to imminent danger or an animal being attacked.
 Threat call: A hissing sound that has also been described as a coughing noise.
 Hatching call: Emitted by a female when breeding to alert other crocodiles that she has laid eggs in her nest.
 Bellowing: Male crocodiles are especially vociferous. Bellowing choruses occur most often in the spring when breeding groups congregate, but can occur at any time of year. To bellow, males noticeably inflate as they raise the tail and head out of water, slowly waving the tail back and forth. They then puff out the throat and with a closed mouth, begin to vibrate air. Just before bellowing, males project an infrasonic signal at about 10 Hz through the water, which vibrates the ground and nearby objects. These low-frequency vibrations travel great distances through both air and water to advertise the male's presence and are so powerful they result in the water's appearing to "dance".

Reproduction

Crocodiles lay eggs, which are laid in either holes or mound nests, depending on species. A hole nest is usually excavated in sand and a mound nest is usually constructed out of vegetation. Nesting periods range from a few weeks up to six months. Courtship takes place in a series of behavioural interactions that include a variety of snout rubbing and submissive display that can take a long time. Mating always takes place in water, where the pair can be observed mating several times. Females can build or dig several trial nests which appear incomplete and abandoned later. Egg-laying usually takes place at night and about 30–40 minutes. Females are highly protective of their nests and young. The eggs are hard shelled, but translucent at the time of egg-laying. Depending on the species of crocodile, 7 to 95 eggs are laid. Crocodile embryos do not have sex chromosomes, and unlike humans, sex is not determined genetically. A temperature of  gives mostly males whereas above  in some species continues to give males, but in other species resulting in females, which are sometimes called high-temperature females. Temperature also affects growth and survival rate of the young, which may explain the sexual dimorphism in crocodiles. The average incubation period is around 80 days, and also is dependent on temperature and species that usually ranges from 65 to 95 days. The eggshell structure is very conservative through evolution but there are enough changes to tell different species apart by their eggshell microstructure. Scutes may play a role in calcium storage for eggshell formation.

At the time of hatching, the young start calling within the eggs. They have an egg-tooth at the tip of their snouts, which is developed from the skin, and that helps them pierce out of the shell. Hearing the calls, the female usually excavates the nest and sometimes takes the unhatched eggs in her mouth, slowly rolling the eggs to help the process. The young is usually carried to the water in the mouth. She would then introduce her hatchlings to the water and even feed them. The mother would then take care of her young for over a year before the next mating season. In the absence of the mother crocodile, the father would act in her place to take care of the young. However, even with a sophisticated parental nurturing, young crocodiles have a very high mortality rate due to their vulnerability to predation. A group of hatchlings is called a pod or crèche and may be protected for months.

Cognition
Crocodiles possess some advanced cognitive abilities. They can observe and use patterns of prey behaviour, such as when prey come to the river to drink at the same time each day. Vladimir Dinets of the University of Tennessee, observed that crocodiles use twigs as bait for birds looking for nesting material. They place sticks on their snouts and partly submerge themselves.  When the birds swooped in to get the sticks, the crocodiles then catch the birds. Crocodiles only do this in spring nesting seasons of the birds, when there is high demand for sticks to be used for building nests. Vladimir also discovered other similar observations from various scientists, some dating back to the 19th century. Aside from using sticks, crocodiles are also capable of cooperative hunting. Large numbers of crocodiles swim in circles to trap fish and take turns snatching them. In hunting larger prey, crocodiles swarm in, with one holding the prey down as the others rip it apart.

According to a 2015 study, crocodiles engage in all three main types of play behaviour recorded in animals: locomotor play, play with objects and social play. Play with objects is reported most often, but locomotor play such as repeatedly sliding down slopes, and social play such as riding on the backs of other crocodiles is also reported. This behaviour was exhibited with conspecifics and mammals and is apparently not uncommon, though has been difficult to observe and interpret in the past due to obvious dangers of interacting with large carnivores.

Taxonomy and phylogeny

Crocodylidae is cladistically defined as a crown group composed of the last common ancestor of the Nile crocodile (Crocodylus niloticus), the Dwarf crocodile (Osteolaemus tetraspis), and all of its descendants. It contains two subfamilies: Crocodylinae and Osteolaeminae.  Crocodylinae contains 13-14 living species, as well as 6 extinct species.  Osteolaeminae was named by Christopher Brochu in 2003 as a subfamily of Crocodylidae separate from Crocodylinae, and contains the two extant genera Osteolaemus and Mecistops, along with several extinct genera.  The number of extant species within Osteolaeminae is currently in question.

 Subfamily Crocodylinae
 Genus Crocodylus
Crocodylus acutus, American crocodile
Crocodylus halli, Hall's New Guinea crocodile found South of the New Guinea Highlands
Crocodylus intermedius, Orinoco crocodile
Crocodylus johnsoni, freshwater crocodile, or Johnstone's crocodile
Crocodylus mindorensis, Philippine crocodile
Crocodylus moreletii, Morelet's crocodile or Mexican crocodile
Crocodylus niloticus, Nile crocodile or African crocodile (the subspecies found in Madagascar is sometimes called the black crocodile)
Crocodylus novaeguineae, New Guinea crocodile found North of the New Guinea Highlands
Crocodylus palustris, mugger, marsh or Indian crocodile
Crocodylus porosus, saltwater crocodile or estuarine crocodile
Crocodylus raninus, the Borneo crocodile, is currently considered to be a synonym of Crocodylus porosus; whether or not it is a distinct species remains unclear.
Crocodylus rhombifer, Cuban crocodile
Crocodylus siamensis, Siamese crocodile (may be extinct in the wild)
Crocodylus suchus, West African crocodile, desert or sacred crocodile
Crocodylus anthropophagus
Crocodylus checchiai
Crocodylus falconensis
Crocodylus palaeindicus
Crocodylus thorbjarnarsoni
 Genus Voay
Voay robustus (formerly Crocodylus robustus)
 Subfamily Osteolaeminae
 Genus Osteolaemus
 Osteolaemus tetraspis, dwarf crocodile (There has been controversy as to whether or not this is actually two species; recent (2010) DNA analysis indicate three distinct species: O. tetraspis, O. osborni and a third, currently unnamed.)
 Genus Mecistops
Mecistops cataphractus West African slender-snouted crocodile
 Mecistops leptorhynchus Central African slender-snouted crocodile
 Genus Brochuchus
 Brochuchus pigotti (formerly Crocodylus pigotti)
 Brochuchus parvidens
 Genus Euthecodon
 Euthecodon nitriae
 Euthecodon brumpti
 Euthecodon arambourgi
 Genus Rimasuchus
 Rimasuchus lloydi (formerly Crocodylus lloydi)

Phylogeny
Recent molecular studies using DNA sequencing have shown crocodiles to be more closely related to the gavialids rather than to alligators, contrary to prior theories based on morphological studies alone.

Below is a cladogram showing the relationships of the major extant crocodile groups based on molecular studies, excluding separate extinct taxa:

Below is a more detailed cladogram of Crocodylidae, based on a 2021 study using paleogenomics that extracted DNA from the extinct Voay.

Alternatively, some morphological studies have recovered Mecistops as a basal member of Crocodylinae, more closely related to Crocodylus than to Osteolaemus and the other members of Osteolaeminae, as shown in the cladogram below.

Relationship with humans

Danger to humans

The larger species of crocodiles are very dangerous to humans, mainly because of their ability to strike before the person can react. The saltwater crocodile and Nile crocodile are the most dangerous, killing hundreds of people each year in parts of Southeast Asia and Africa. The mugger crocodile and American crocodile are also dangerous to humans.

Crocodile products

Crocodiles are protected in many parts of the world, but are also farmed commercially. Their hides are tanned and used to make leather goods such as shoes and handbags; crocodile meat is also considered a delicacy. The most commonly farmed species are the saltwater and Nile crocodiles, while a hybrid of the saltwater and the rare Siamese crocodile is also bred in Asian farms. Farming has resulted in an increase in the saltwater crocodile population in Australia, as eggs are usually harvested from the wild, so landowners have an incentive to conserve their habitat. Crocodile leather can be made into goods such as wallets, briefcases, purses, handbags, belts, hats, and shoes. Crocodile oil has been used for various purposes. Crocodiles were eaten by Vietnamese while they were taboo and off limits for Chinese. Vietnamese women who married Chinese men adopted the Chinese taboo.

Crocodile meat is consumed in some countries, such as Australia, Ethiopia, Thailand, South Africa, China and also Cuba (in pickled form). It is also occasionally eaten as an "exotic" delicacy in the western world. Cuts of meat include backstrap and tail fillet.

Due to high demand for crocodile products, TRAFFIC states that 1,418,487 Nile Crocodile skins were exported from Africa between 2006 and 2015.

In religion

Crocodiles have appeared in various forms in religions across the world. Ancient Egypt had Sobek, the crocodile-headed god, with his cult-city Crocodilopolis, as well as Taweret, the goddess of childbirth and fertility, with the back and tail of a crocodile. The Jukun shrine in the Wukari Federation, Nigeria is dedicated to crocodiles in thanks for their aid during migration. In Madagascar various peoples such as the Sakalava and Antandroy see crocodiles as ancestor spirits and under local fady often offer them food; in the case of the latter at least a crocodile features prominently as an ancestor deity.

Crocodiles appear in different forms in Hinduism. Varuna, a Vedic and Hindu god, rides a part-crocodile makara; his consort Varuni rides a crocodile. Similarly the goddess personifications of the Ganga and Yamuna rivers are often depicted as riding crocodiles. Also in India, in Goa, crocodile worship is practised, including the annual Mannge Thapnee ceremony.

Akali Nihang Sikh warriors also have connections with crocodiles. Nihang may come from the Persian word for a mythical sea creature. The term owes its origin to Mughal historians, who compared the ferocity of the Akali with that of crocodiles. The meaning of Akali in Sikhism however, is the immortal army of Akal (god).

In Latin America, Cipactli was the giant earth crocodile of the Aztec and other Nahua peoples.

Crocodile tears

The term "crocodile tears" (and equivalents in other languages) refers to a false, insincere display of emotion, such as a hypocrite crying fake tears of grief. It is derived from an ancient anecdote that crocodiles weep in order to lure their prey, or that they cry for the victims they are eating, first told in the Bibliotheca by Photios I of Constantinople. The story is repeated in bestiaries such as De bestiis et aliis rebus. This tale was first spread widely in English in the stories of the Travels of Sir John Mandeville in the 14th century, and appears in several of Shakespeare's plays. In fact, crocodiles can and do generate tears, but they do not actually cry.

The Surabaya Shark and Crocodile

The name of Surabaya, Indonesia, is locally believed to be derived from the words "suro" (shark) and "boyo" (crocodile), two creatures which, in a local myth, fought each other in order to gain the title of "the strongest and most powerful animal" in the area. It was said that the two powerful animals agreed for a truce and set boundaries; that the shark's domain would be in the sea while the crocodile's domain would be on the land. However one day the shark swam into the river estuary to hunt, this angered the crocodile, who declared it his territory. The Shark argued that the river was a water-realm which meant that it was shark territory, while the crocodile argued that the river flowed deep inland, so it was therefore crocodile territory. A ferocious fight resumed as the two animals bit each other. Finally the shark was badly bitten and fled to the open sea, and the crocodile finally ruled the estuarine area that today is the city.

Another source alludes to a Jayabaya prophecy—a 12th-century psychic king of Kediri Kingdom—as he foresaw a fight between a giant white shark and a giant white crocodile taking place in the area, which is sometimes interpreted as a foretelling of the Mongol invasion of Java, a major conflict between the forces of the Kublai Khan, Mongol ruler of China, and those of Raden Wijaya's Majapahit in 1293. The two animals are now used as the city's symbol, with the two facing and circling each other, as depicted in a statue appropriately located near the entrance to the city zoo (see photo on the Surabaya page).

Crocodile (walking)
In the UK, a row of schoolchildren walking in pairs, or two by two is known as 'crocodile'.

Fashion
The French clothing company Lacoste features its iconic crocodile in its logo. The American shoe company Crocs also uses this imagery in its logo.

See also

Alligator meat
The Crocodile Hunter 
Crocodilian armor
Game (hunting)
Sewer alligator
Sobek – an ancient Egyptian deity associated with the Nile crocodile

References

Further reading
 Iskandar, DT (2000). Turtles and Crocodiles of Insular Southeast Asia and New Guinea. ITB, Bandung.
 Crocodilian Biology Database, FAQ. FLMNH.ufl.edu, "How long do crocodiles live for?"  Adam Britton.
 Crocodilian Biology Database, FAQ. FLMNH.ufl.edu, "How fast can a crocodile run?" Adam Britton.

External links

 Crocodilian Online
 Crocodilian Biology Database
 Crocodile Attacks in Australia
 BBC news finds powerful agent in crocodile blood
 World's most expensive handbag sells in Hong Kong for over US$377,000 – a Hermès white crocodile (31 May 2017), South China Morning Post
 292 New Guinea crocodiles massacred in West Papua, Indonesia

Crocodylidae
Reptiles of Asia
Reptiles of Africa
Crocodiles of Australia
Reptiles of North America
Reptiles of South America
Extant Ypresian first appearances
Taxa named by Georges Cuvier